Karen Lawrence may refer to:

 Karen Lawrence (singer-songwriter), American singer and songwriter 
 Karen Lawrence (writer) (born 1952), Canadian writer
 Karen R. Lawrence (born 1949), president of the Huntington Library, Art Museum, and Botanical Gardens